Testosterone 17beta-dehydrogenase (NADP+) (17-ketoreductase, NADP-dependent testosterone-17beta-oxidoreductase, testosterone 17beta-dehydrogenase (NADP)) is an enzyme with systematic name 17beta-hydroxysteroid:NADP+ 17-oxidoreductase. This enzyme catalyses the following chemical reaction

 testosterone + NADP+  androstenedione + NADPH + H+

Also oxidizes 3-hydroxyhexobarbital to 3-oxohexobarbital.

References

External links 
 

EC 1.1.1